Jersey Robin Jan van Doornspeek (born 25 February 1981 in Velsen) is a Dutch baseball player.

Van Doornspeek represented the Netherlands at the 2004 Summer Olympics in Athens where he and his team became sixth.

External links
Van Doornspeek at the Dutch Olympic Archive

1981 births
Living people
Baseball players at the 2004 Summer Olympics
Olympic baseball players of the Netherlands
Dutch baseball players
People from Velsen
2006 World Baseball Classic players
Konica Minolta Pioniers players
DOOR Neptunus players
ADO players
Sportspeople from North Holland